Ebiti Ndok-Jegede  (born Ebiti Onoyom Ndok) is a Nigerian politician. She ran for presidency in the 2011 presidential election under the platform of the United National Party for Development, a party she once served as National Chairman.

Life and career
Born in Ibadan, the capital city of Oyo State, South-Western Nigeria, Ndok-Jegede is a native of Akwa Ibom State, Nigeria. She attended St Anne's School Ibadan for secondary school education. She started her career as a practicing nurse at the University College Hospital, Ibadan before she proceeded to the United Kingdom, where she obtained a degree in Management, Law, and Diplomatic Studies and also did Social Welfare training. In 2011, she was the only woman who ran for president of Nigeria under the platform of the United National Party for Development, receiving 98,262 votes.

Personal life
Ndok-Jegede is married with four children.

References

Living people
Nigerian nurses
People from Ibadan
People from Akwa Ibom State
Candidates in the Nigerian general election, 2011
21st-century Nigerian women politicians
21st-century Nigerian politicians
Year of birth missing (living people)
St Anne's School, Ibadan alumni